Probreviceps is a small genus of brevicipitine frogs with only six members. They occur in the montane forests of Tanzania, Zimbabwe, and possibly Mozambique. They are sometimes known as the forest frogs, forest rain frogs, big-fingered frogs, or primitive rain frogs.

Description
Probreviceps are burrowing frogs with short limbs and direct development (i.e., there is no free-living larval stage); the eggs are deposited in burrows. Males often have larger tympani than females. No discs are present on fingers or toes. Species identification is based on male advertisement calls, features of hands and feet, and distribution.

Species
There are six recognized species:
 Probreviceps durirostris, Snouted forest frog 
 Probreviceps loveridgei, Loveridge's forest frog 
 Probreviceps macrodactylus, Large-fingered forest frog 
 Probreviceps rhodesianus, Highland forest frog 
 Probreviceps rungwensis, Rungwe forest frog 
 Probreviceps uluguruensis, Uluguru forest frog

References

 
Brevicipitidae
Amphibian genera
Amphibians of Sub-Saharan Africa
Taxa named by Hampton Wildman Parker